Green Lake is located in North Cascades National Park, in the U. S. state of Washington. Another series of waterfalls lie below Green Lake and are known as Green Lake Falls which drop another .

References

Lakes of Washington (state)
North Cascades National Park
Lakes of Whatcom County, Washington